Testalinden is a historic area, school, creek, and a dam south of the Okanagan town of Oliver, British Columbia.

Disasters

The dam at Testalinden Lake located on Mt. Kobau burst June 13, 2010 at approximately 2:15 creating a debris torrent landslide that descended about 2 kilometres to the valley below destroying at least 5 homes and farms. The dam was built in the 1930s and was in poor maintenance at the time. After a heavy rainfall the dam wasn't able to hold up the lake above and gave way. The debris blocked British Columbia Highway 97 and the creek created a new channel spilling over the highway. BC Highway 97 was cleared with the challenge of removing a home that slid onto the highway.  Testalinden Creek was later rehabilitated by returning it to its former channel, which was heavily armoured with rock.

On August 14, 2015, lightning caused a large wildfire in the Testalinden Creek area. Strong winds quickly spread the fire, which burned 5,202 hectares.

References

External links
 

Rivers of British Columbia